Zagorje City Stadium is a multi-purpose stadium in Zagorje ob Savi, Slovenia. It is used mostly for football matches and is the home ground of NK Zagorje. The stadium holds 1,080 spectators.

See also
List of football stadiums in Slovenia

References

External links
Stadioni.org profile
Soccerfame profile

Football venues in Slovenia
Multi-purpose stadiums in Slovenia
Sports venues completed in 1951
20th-century architecture in Slovenia